Gilbertiodendron klainei is a species of plant in the family Fabaceae. It is found only in Gabon.

References

klainei
Endemic flora of Gabon
Vulnerable flora of Africa
Taxonomy articles created by Polbot